Drage may refer to:

Drage, Metlika, a village in Slovenia
Drage, Nordfriesland, a village in Schleswig-Holstein, Germany
Drage, Steinburg, a village in Schleswig-Holstein, Germany
Drage, Lower Saxony, a village in Lower Saxony, Germany
the German name for the river Drawa in Poland
Drage, Zadar County, a village near Pakoštane, Croatia
Drage, Karlovac County, a village near Rakovica, Croatia

See also
 Draga (disambiguation)